Patrick "Staker" Wallace (1733 - 1798) was a United Irishman, perhaps born at Teermore, in Bulgaden-Ballinvana parish of County Limerick, Ireland, near the town of Kilfinane. He achieved some fame as an Irish patriot when he was brutally executed for independence activities by a pro-British nobleman in 1798.

Name 
Most commonly known as Staker Wallace or The Staker, his first name was most likely Patrick. His nickname was given to him after his death. Some sources give his first name as William or Edmond (Edmund), but these are less likely than Patrick. In her 1909 book about her ancestor, Eunice Graham Brandt referred to Staker as William. After being beheaded, his head was put on a stake for everyone to see. Thus, Staker Wallace. The monument in his honour in Martinstown, Limerick, refers to him as Edmond.  Unfortunately, contemporary news accounts in the Limerick Chronicle are long-lost. Nonetheless, his correct first name can be established from other sources.

According to traditional Irish naming patterns, the first-born son was named after his paternal grandfather. Both of Staker's sons named their first-born sons Patrick. A history of Limerick published in 1866 included a list of sentences passed by the General Court Martial in Limerick on 4 July 1798. Included on the list: "Patrick Wallis, for collecting subscriptions for procuring the assassination of Chas. S. Oliver, Esq., to be hanged at Kilfinane, his head to be affixed on one of his own pikes, and placed on the castle." A document on the United Irishmen in Limerick found in the 1940s in the Irish State Paper Office listed prisoners in the new gaol (jail) in 1798. Ten of those listed had been executed, including a Patrick Wallis.  Wallis and Wallace are interchangeable spellings of his surname. Both were used in County Limerick at the time.

Background 
Patrick Wallace's extended family had lived in the southeast parishes of County Limerick for generations. He married Hanora Riordan of Glenroe in 1758 and had five children: William, Patrick Jr., Mary, Joan (Jane), and Hanora. Wallace was a small farmer in his 60s when he became involved in revolutionary activities.

Involvement in 1798 rebellion 
Wallace was involved in the disturbances leading up to the 1798 rebellion in Ireland, and was hung as a local captain of the United Irishmen. "Staker" Wallace was arrested in late March 1798.  He was charged with being a disloyal revolutionary and plotting the assassination of Captain Charles Silver Oliver. On 21 April 1798, Wallace was publicly flogged at a cattle fair at Ballinvreena. One account makes it sound as though he was hanged, drawn and quartered, and finally beheaded immediately afterwards, when the torture failed to yield the desired results. Another source says he was executed in July 1798. He died in the town of Kilfinane. His nickname may derive from the fact that his severed head was placed on a stake to serve as a warning to others, although it more likely preceded his execution and was linked to stakes used in connection with the commonages. His body was buried at the Abbey burial grounds, Glenroe-Ballyorgan parish, County Limerick.

Wallace may have been a local leader of a group known as the Whiteboys. They dressed up in sheets at night and rooted up the hedges with which landlords had enclosed land formerly held in common by the community. This was a change designed to benefit the wealthy at the expense of the poor. The change was also seen as a further insult to traditional Irish culture perpetrated by those loyal to the British empire. The Society of United Irishmen was a union of Catholics and Protestants determined to gain a representative government for Ireland through separation from England.

Relatives 
In the 1850s, many of Staker's grandchildren, great-grandchildren, and collateral relatives emigrated to Kane County, Illinois, USA, a rural area west of Chicago. They used the "Wallace" spelling of the name, rather than the "Wallis" spelling which was often, but not exclusively, used back home. Several are buried at St. Mary's Cemetery in Gilberts, Rutland Township, Kane County.

In culture 
There is a traditional Irish ballad about Patrick Wallace called "Death of Staker Wallace" or "Lament for Staker Wallace" (title variant: Wallis). Its melody is known but only a few of its lyrics survive. It is an air traditionally associated with the uilleann pipes. A version of the air, played by fiddler Eileen Ivers, appears in the soundtrack of the Martin Scorsese film Gangs of New York (2002). However, "Lament for Staker Wallace" does not appear on the film's original soundtrack CD.

References

Further reading 
 of Patrick Wallace's life is found in the book Staker Wallis: His Life and Times and Death by Mainchin Seoighe, published in Ireland in 1994.

External links
Information about Staker on homepage of Effin National School, Kilmallock, County Limerick
Memoirs of the Staker Wallace by Eunice Graham Brandt, 1909 – Staker's first name incorrectly given as William; Brandt provides extensive genealogical information about American descendants
Article about historian Mainchin Seoighe, biographer of Patrick "Staker" Wallace
Documented details about Staker's name, life, and death
Information about the town of Kilfinane
Lyrics and background of Staker ballad
Gangs of New York soundtrack information

1733 births
1798 deaths
People from County Limerick
United Irishmen